was the Olympic flame torchbearer who lit the cauldron at the 1964 Summer Olympic Games in Tokyo.

Biography
Sakai was born on the day of the atomic bombing of Hiroshima. He was chosen for the role to symbolize Japan's postwar reconstruction and peace. An enthusiastic part-time athlete, at the time of the 1964 Olympics he was a member of Waseda University's running club. The nineteen-year-old was coached in the ceremonial duty by Teruji Kogake, a triple jump world record-holder turned coach. He never actually competed in any events at the Olympics.

Two years after the Olympic games, he won a gold medal in the 4 × 400 m relay and a silver in the 400 m at the 1966 Asian Games. He joined Fuji Television in 1968 as a journalist and worked mainly in the fields of news and sports.

He died of cerebral bleeding in Tokyo at age 69, on September 10, 2014.

References

External links 
 

1945 births
2014 deaths
Sportspeople from Hiroshima Prefecture
People of Shōwa-period Japan
Japanese male sprinters
Japanese television journalists
Olympic cauldron lighters
Asian Games gold medalists for Japan
Asian Games medalists in athletics (track and field)
Asian Games silver medalists for Japan
Athletes (track and field) at the 1966 Asian Games
Medalists at the 1966 Asian Games
Japan Championships in Athletics winners
Waseda University alumni